UFC Fight Night: Moraes vs. Sandhagen (also known as UFC Fight Night 179, UFC on ESPN+ 37 and UFC Fight Island 5) was a mixed martial arts event produced by the Ultimate Fighting Championship that took place on October 11, 2020 at the du Forum on Yas Island, Abu Dhabi, United Arab Emirates.

Background
Without fans in attendance, the promotion did not have to worry about the local timing of the event, so the plan was to proceed with normal timing for prime time hours on the east coast of North America. The main card was scheduled to begin at 4:00 am (October 11) local time in Abu Dhabi, with a full preliminary card beginning at approximately 1:00 am Gulf Standard Time.

A bantamweight bout between former WSOF Bantamweight Champion and UFC Bantamweight Championship challenger Marlon Moraes and Cory Sandhagen served as the event headliner.

A featherweight bout between Edson Barboza and Jeremy Stephens was briefly linked to the event. However, Stephens declined the fight after indicating he did not feel the date allowed him adequate time to prepare and safely make the required weight. Barboza was scheduled to face Sodiq Yusuff instead. In turn, Yusuff pulled out of the fight on September 21 due to undisclosed reasons. He was replaced by Makwan Amirkhani.

A flyweight bout between promotional newcomer Tagir Ulanbekov and Bruno Gustavo da Silva was expected to take place four weeks earlier at UFC Fight Night: Waterson vs. Hill. However, due to travel restrictions related to the COVID-19 pandemic, the pairing was rescheduled and took place at this event.

Rodolfo Vieira was expected to face Markus Perez in a middleweight bout at the event. However, Vieira pulled out on September 21 due to an injury sustained during training. He was replaced by former KSW Welterweight Champion Dricus du Plessis.

A middleweight bout between Abu Azaitar and Joaquin Buckley was expected to take place at the event. However, Azaitar pulled out on September 26 due to undisclosed reasons and was replaced by Impa Kasanganay.

A middleweight bout between Tom Breese and KB Bhullar was briefly scheduled to take place at UFC on ESPN: Holm vs. Aldana a week earlier, before being moved to this event.

A featherweight bout between Seung Woo Choi and Youssef Zalal was scheduled for the event. However, it was announced on October 2 that Choi withdrew from the fight. He was replaced by promotional newcomer Ilia Topuria.

A heavyweight bout between Sergey Spivak and Tom Aspinall was expected to take place at the event. However, Spivak withdrew from the bout in early October due to undisclosed reasons and was replaced by promotional newcomer Alan Baudot.

A women's bantamweight bout between Tracy Cortez and Bea Malecki was also scheduled for the event. Due to undisclosed reasons, it was announced on October 2 that promotional newcomer Stephanie Egger would replace Malecki.

The Ultimate Fighter: Latin America bantamweight winner Alejandro Pérez was expected to face Thomas Almeida in a bantamweight bout at the event. However, it was announced on October 2 that Pérez had been forced out of the bout after he tested positive for COVID-19. He was replaced by Jonathan Martinez and the bout then moved to UFC Fight Night: Ortega vs. The Korean Zombie a week later, where it took place at featherweight.

Results

Bonus awards 
The following fighters received $50,000 bonuses.
Fight of the Night: No bonus awarded.
Performance of the Night: Cory Sandhagen, Tom Breese, Chris Daukaus and Joaquin Buckley

See also 

 List of UFC events
 List of current UFC fighters
 2020 in UFC

References 

UFC Fight Night
2020 in mixed martial arts
2020 in Emirati sport
Mixed martial arts in the United Arab Emirates
Sports competitions in Abu Dhabi
October 2020 sports events in Asia